The Funking Conservatory is a professional wrestling school owned by Dory Funk Jr. and established in 1991. It started as a six-day camp, but it later expanded to a three-week program. In 2001, it began running a professional wrestling promotion called "!Bang!" Members of the school and promotion had a chance to appear on its television show !Bang! TV.

School
In 1999, while he was in semi-retirement, Dory Funk Jr. decided to open a professional wrestling camp to train professional wrestlers. It had a branch affiliated with the World Wrestling Federation called the "Funkin' Dojo."

The Funking Conservatory began as a six-day camp, and it teaches wrestlers how to perform promos, conditioning, and weight training. They also train professional wrestling referees. The school accepts students starting at 14 years old. It also trains wrestlers in hardcore wrestling—focusing on safety—and includes a hardcore match in every show.

It later expanded to a three-week program. In 2001, it began running a professional wrestling promotion called !Bang!. Members of the school and promotion had a chance to appear on its television show, !Bang! TV. Funk's wife Marti is a producer on the show in addition to acting as the photographer, videographer, and social media director for the school.

In 2004, the school moved to the Dory Funk Arena in Ocala, Florida. It consists of a ring, sound stage, and locker rooms.

!Bang! TV
The promotion's !BANG! TV television tapings are held in the Dory Funk Arena on Saturday nights. Billed as "the most exciting pro-wrestling show on the air" and hosted by Dory Funk Jr., !Bang! TV transmitted weekly on WOGX TV-51, and also My65. A special one-off edition of !BANG! TV was shown on The Wrestling Channel to viewers in the United Kingdom and Ireland. The show also transmits online via their website.

Championships

Current
Funking Conservatory World Heavyweight Championship
Funking Conservatory Tag Team Championship
Funking Conservatory United States Championship
Funking Conservatory Florida Heavyweight Championship
Funking Conservatory Television Championship
Funking Conservatory Hardcore Championship
Funking Conservatory Light Heavyweight Championship
Funking Conservatory Women's Championship

Retired, defunct, and inactive championships
Funking Conservatory International Championship
Funking Conservatory European Championship
Funking Conservatory Premium Championship
Funking Conservatory Queen of Hardcore Championship

See also
List of independent wrestling promotions in the United States

References

External links
!Bang! website

Independent professional wrestling promotions based in Florida
Professional wrestling schools
1999 establishments in the United States